The Sri Lanka Rathna is a national honour of Sri Lanka for foreigners or non nationals, awarded "for exceptional and outstanding service to the nation". It comprises a citation and a gold medal studded with nine "navaratnas" (Sri Lankan gems) with a Manel symbol (the country's national flower).

Awardees
Awardees include:

1998
 Susumu Saegi

2005
 Bernard de Gaulle
 David C. Sanders
 Hosel Norota
 Sir Michael Morris
 Michael Ondaatje
 N. Ram
 S. D. Muni
 Tetsuya Hino
 Thilo W. Hoffmann

2019
 Yasushi Akashi

References

External links

 
Civil awards and decorations of Sri Lanka